Reaching Horizons is a demo-tape by the Brazilian power metal band Angra released in 1993 through Limb Music. The original cassette contained six songs, with some re-recorded for their debut album Angels Cry. In 1997, the record-company re-released the album, adding three bonus tracks. The songs were recorded in July 1992 at the Guidon Studios, São Paulo, by sound engineer Ezequias Aureliano, except for the last two which were recorded in January 1993 at the  Anonimatos Studios in São Paulo. It is the only release by the band that features Antunes on drums before he was replaced during the sessions for their debut album.

Track listing

Credits
 André Matos — vocals, keyboards
 Kiko Loureiro — lead and rhythm guitars
 Rafael Bittencourt — rhythm and lead guitars
 Luís Mariutti — bass
 Marco Antunes — drums

References

Angra (band) albums
1992 albums